Christiana "Christiane" Friderica Weidner later Huberin (1730–1799) was an Austrian stage actor. She was engaged at the Burgtheater in 1748–1799. She belonged to the pioneer generation actors of the Burgtheater and was referred to as their Doyenne. She was foremost known for her roles within tragedies. She married the actor Joseph Karl Huber (1726–1760).

References 

 Constantin von Wurzbach: Weidner, Christiane Friederike. In: Biographisches Lexikon des Kaiserthums Oesterreich. 53. Theil. Kaiserlich-königliche Hof- und Staatsdruckerei, Wien 1886

1730 births
1799 deaths
18th-century Austrian actresses
Austrian stage actresses